Caroline Müller is a Swiss football striker who most recently played for Grasshopper Zürich in the Swiss Women's Super League. She has also played for Levante UD in the Spanish Superleague.

Müller was called up to the Swiss national team, firstly in a friendly against Japan in October 2017 and later in a World Cup qualifier against Albania in November 2017. She was an unused substitute in all of her international games.

References

1989 births
Living people
Swiss women's footballers
Women's association football forwards
Grasshopper Club Zürich (women) players
Levante UD Femenino players
SE AEM players
Swiss Women's Super League players
Primera División (women) players
Switzerland women's international footballers
Swiss expatriate women's footballers
Swiss expatriate sportspeople in Spain
Expatriate women's footballers in Spain